Anthony Carr may refer to:

 Anthony Carr (psychic) (born 1943), Canadian psychic
 Tony Carr (born 1950), English football coach and former player 
 Tony Carr (basketball) (born 1997), American basketball player